The Faroe Islands competed at the 1984 Summer Paralympics co-hosted by Stoke Mandeville, United Kingdom and New York City, United States. The Faroe Islands were competing at the Paralympic Games for the first time, and were represented by three swimmers: Katrin Johansen, Ólavur Kongsbak and Kristvør Rasmussen. The Faroese competitors did not win any medals.

References

Nations at the 1984 Summer Paralympics
1984
Paralympics